The MS Estonia sank on Wednesday, 28 September 1994, between about 00:50 and 01:50 (UTC+2) as the ship was crossing the Baltic Sea, en route from Tallinn, Estonia, to Stockholm, Sweden. The sinking was one of the worst maritime disasters of the 20th century. It is one of the deadliest peacetime sinkings of a European ship, after the Titanic in 1912 and the Empress of Ireland in 1914, and the deadliest peacetime shipwreck to have occurred in European waters, with 852 lives lost.

Sinking
Estonia departed slightly behind schedule at 19:15 on 27 September and was expected in Stockholm the next morning at about 09:00. She was carrying 989 people: 803 passengers and 186 crew. Most of the passengers were Swedish, although some were of Estonian origin, while most of the crew members were Estonian. The ship was fully loaded, and was listing slightly to starboard (to the right looking from the ship in the direction of its travel) because of poor cargo distribution.

Esa Mäkelä, the captain of Silja Europa who was appointed on-scene commander for the subsequent rescue effort, described the weather as "normally bad", or like a typical autumn storm in the Baltic Sea. All scheduled passenger ferries were at sea, something not unusual for this weather in the Baltic Sea. The official report says that while the exact speed at the time of the accident is not known, Estonia had very regular voyage times, averaging .

The first sign of trouble aboard Estonia was when a metallic bang was heard, presumably caused by a heavy wave hitting the bow doors around 01:00, when the ship was on the outskirts of the Turku archipelago, but an inspection—limited to checking the indicator lights for the ramp and visor—showed no problems. Over the next 10 minutes, similar noises were reported by passengers and other crew. At about 01:15, the visor is believed to have separated and torn open the loading ramp behind it. The ship immediately took on a heavy starboard list (initially around 15 degrees, but by 01:30, the ship had rolled 60 degrees and by 01:50 the list was 90 degrees) as water flooded into the vehicle deck. Estonia was turned to port and slowed before her four engines cut out completely.

At about 01:20, a quiet female voice called "Häire, häire, laeval on häire", Estonian for "Alarm, alarm, there is alarm on the ship", over the public address system, which was followed immediately by an internal alarm for the crew, then one minute later by the general emergency signal. The vessel's rapid list and the flooding prevented many people in the cabins from ascending to the boat deck, as water not only flooded the vessel via the car deck, but also through windows in cabins as well as the massive windows along deck 6. The windows gave way to the powerful waves as the ship listed and the sea reached the upper decks. Survivors reported that water flowed down from ceiling panels, stairwells and along corridors from decks that were not yet under water. This contributed to the rapid sinking. A mayday was communicated by the ship's crew at 01:22, but did not follow international formats. Estonia directed a call to Silja Europa and only after making contact with her did the radio operator utter the word "Mayday". The radio operator on Silja Europa, chief mate Teijo Seppelin, replied in English: "Estonia, are you calling mayday?" After that, the voice of third mate Andres Tammes took over on Estonia and the conversation shifted to Finnish.

Tammes was able to provide some details about their situation but, due to a loss of power, he could not give their position, which delayed rescue operations somewhat. Tammes would later die in the sinking. Some minutes later, power returned (or somebody on the bridge managed to lower him or herself to the starboard side of the bridge to check the marine GPS, which will display the ship's position even in blackout conditions), and the Estonia was able to radio its position to Silja Europa and Mariella. According to survivor accounts, the ship sank stern first after taking a list of 90 degrees.

Rescue effort
Search and rescue followed arrangements set up under the 1979 International Convention on Maritime Search and Rescue (the SAR Convention), and the nearest Maritime Rescue Co-ordination Centre MRCC Turku coordinated the effort in accordance with Finland's plans. The Baltic is one of the world's busiest shipping areas, with 2,000 vessels at sea at any time, and these plans assumed the ship's own boats and nearby ferries would provide immediate help and that helicopters could be airborne after an hour. This scheme had worked for the relatively small number of accidents involving sinkings, particularly as most ships have few people on board.

Mariella, the first of five ferries to reach the scene of the accident, arrived at 02:12. MRCC Turku failed to acknowledge the Mayday immediately and Mariellas report was relayed by Helsinki Radio as the less urgent pan-pan message. A full-scale emergency was only declared at 02:30. Mariella winched open liferafts into the sea onto which 13 people on Estonias rafts successfully transferred, and reported the location of other rafts to Swedish and Finnish rescue helicopters, the first of which arrived at 03:05. The former took survivors to shore, while the latter—Finnish border guard helicopters Super Puma OH-HVG and Agusta Bell 412 OH-HVD—chose the riskier option of landing on the ferries. The pilot of OH-HVG stated that landing on the ferries was the most difficult part of the whole rescue operation; despite that, this single helicopter rescued 44 people, more than all the ferries. MS Isabella saved 16 survivors with its rescue slide.

Victims 

Of the 989 on board, 138 were rescued, one of whom died later in hospital. Ships rescued 34 and helicopters 104; the ferries played a much smaller part than the planners had intended because it was too dangerous to launch their man-overboard (MOB) boats or lifeboats. The accident claimed 852 lives.

One of the victims of the sinking was the Estonian singer Urmas Alender. In total, 94 bodies were recovered: 93 within 33 days of the accident, and the last victim was found 18 months later. By the time the rescue helicopters arrived, around a third of those who escaped from the Estonia had died of hypothermia, while fewer than half of those who had managed to leave the ship were eventually rescued. The survivors of the shipwreck were mostly young males with strong constitutions. Seven over 55 years of age survived and there were no survivors under age 12. About 650 people were still inside the ship when it sank. The commission estimated that up to 310 passengers reached the outer decks, 160 of whom boarded the life-rafts or lifeboats.

Official investigation and report
The wreck was examined and videotaped by remotely operated underwater vehicles and by divers from a Norwegian company, Rockwater A/S, contracted for the investigation work. The official report indicated that the locks on the bow door had failed from the strain of the waves and the door had separated from the rest of the vessel, pulling the ramp behind it ajar. The bow visor and ramp had been torn off at points that would not trigger an "open" or "unlatched" warning on the bridge, as is the case in normal operation or failure of the latches. The bridge was also situated too far back on the ferry for the visor to be seen from there. While there was video monitoring of the inner ramp, the monitor on the bridge was not visible from the conning station. The bow visor was under-designed, as the ship's manufacturing and approval processes did not consider the visor and its attachments as critical items regarding ship safety. The first metallic bang was believed to have been the sound of the visor's lower locking mechanism failing, and that the subsequent noises would have been from the visor 'flapping' against the hull as the other locks failed, before tearing free and exposing the bow ramp. The subsequent failure of the bow ramp allowed water into the vehicle deck, which was identified as the main cause of the capsizing and sinking: RORO ferries with their wide vehicle decks are particularly vulnerable to capsizing if the vehicle deck is even slightly flooded because of free surface effect: the fluid's swirling motion across such a large area hampers the boat's ability to right itself after rolling with a wave. The same effect had caused the capsizing of  seven years earlier.

The report was critical of the crew's actions, particularly for failing to reduce speed before investigating the noises emanating from the bow, and for being unaware that the list was being caused by water entering the vehicle deck. There were also general criticisms of the delays in sounding the alarm, the passivity of the crew, and the lack of guidance from the bridge.

Recommendations for modifications to be applied to similar ships included separation of the condition sensors from the latch and hinge mechanisms.

Changes stemming from the disaster
In 1999, special training requirements in crowd and crisis management and human behaviour were extended to crew on all passenger ships, and amendments were made to watch-keeping standards. Estonias distress beacons or EPIRBs required manual activation, which did not happen. Had they been activated automatically, it would have been immediately obvious that the ship was in distress and the location would have been clear. All EPIRBs were subsequently required to deploy automatically and the accident was "instrumental in the move to legislate Voyage Data Recorders". New International Maritime Organization (IMO) Safety of Life at Sea (SOLAS) liferaft regulations for rescue from listing ships in rough water were introduced.

New designs, the "citadel concept" once again influenced by Estonia, aim to ensure damaged ships have sufficient buoyancy to remain afloat, though cost will determine if any are built. SOLAS 90, which came into effect in 2010, specifies existing passenger ships' stability requirements and those in North West Europe must also be able to survive  of water on the car deck.

2020 investigation

On 28 September 2020, a Swedish documentary was released which used underwater equipment to film the wreck. This investigation found a 4-metre hole in the ship's hull. This prompted the Estonian prime minister and foreign minister to meet with their Swedish and Finnish equivalents and announce that a "new technical investigation" would take place.

The head of the Estonian investigation stated publicly that he believes this new information points to a collision with a submarine and that the hole could not have happened post-sinking. In October 2020, the Estonian government published a report stating that the hole was too small to have sunk the ship as quickly as it did. The Swedish documentary makers were prosecuted for violating the sanctity of the wreck, but were acquitted on 8 February 2021 as the diving happened on a German ship in international waters. Germany had not signed the treaty that declares sanctity over the site. However, as a result of a retrial in September 2022, the filmmakers were finally found guilty and fined.

By June 2021, laws allowing the examination of the wreck for investigation of the disaster were passed in the Swedish and Estonian Parliaments. Shortly after, the Swedish Accident Investigation Authority announced their plan to conduct dives at the grave site starting July 2021.

Effects of the disaster
The disaster had a major impact on ferry safety, leading to changes in safety regulations as well as in life-raft design, much as the RMS Titanic disaster did in 1912.

Conspiracy theories
Conspiracy theories exist about the cause of the sinking. German journalist Jutta Rabe and the British magazine New Statesman claim that laboratory tests on debris recovered illegally from Estonia's bow yielded trace evidence of a deliberate explosion, which they allege was concealed by the Swedish, British, and Russian governments to cover up an intelligence operation smuggling military hardware via the civilian ferry. Members of the Joint Accident Investigation Commission denied these claims, saying that the damage seen on the debris occurred during the visor's detachment from the vessel. The JAIC cited results from Germany's Federal Institute for Materials Research and Testing, which found that Jutta Rabe's samples did not prove an explosion occurred.

Transportation of military equipment
In the autumn of 2004, a former Swedish customs officer claimed on Sveriges Television that Estonia had been used to transport military equipment in September 1994. The Swedish and Estonian governments subsequently launched separate investigations, which both confirmed that non-explosive military equipment was aboard the ship on 14 and 20 September 1994. According to the Swedish Ministry of Defence, no such equipment was on board on the day of the disaster, and previous investigations by the Swedish Customs Service found no reports of any anomalous activity around the day of the disaster.

Protection of the wreck

In the aftermath of the disaster, many relatives of the deceased demanded that their loved ones be raised from international waters and given a land burial. Demands were also made that the entire ship be raised so that the cause of the disaster could be discovered by detailed inspection.
Citing the practical difficulties and the moral implications of raising decaying bodies from the sea floor (the majority of the bodies were never recovered), and fearing the financial burden of lifting the entire hull to the surface and the salvage operation, the Swedish government suggested burying the whole ship in situ with a shell of concrete.

As a preliminary step, thousands of tons of pebbles were dropped on the site. The Estonia Agreement 1995, a treaty among Sweden, Finland, Estonia, Latvia, Poland, Denmark, Russia and the United Kingdom, declared sanctity over the site, prohibiting their citizens from even approaching the wreck. The treaty is, however, only binding for citizens of the countries that are signatories. At least twice, the Swedish Navy has discovered diving operations at the wreck. The wreck's location is monitored on radar by the Finnish Navy.

Media

The sinking of the Estonia has been the subject of a number of documentaries in addition to the feature film Baltic Storm, including:
 History Channel: Sinking of the Estonia
 Zero Hour: The Sinking of the Estonia (2006)
 Built from Disaster: Ships (2009)
 Discovery Plus: Estonia (2020)

It was also mentioned in the Swedish film Force Majeure.

A Finnish eight-part television series about the MS Estonia'''s accident, produced by Fisher King company, is being worked on for the Nordic streaming service C More. According to the creators behind the series, the effort will be the most expensive drama series ever produced in Finland.Fisher King, CMore, MTV, TV4, Beta Film board Estonia series about ferry tragedy – Nordisk Film & TV Fond

In addition, the disaster has inspired several musical works:

 Canticum Calamitatis Maritimae, a choral work by Jaakko Mäntyjärvi
 Incantatio maris aestuosi, a choral work by Veljo Tormis
 "Estonia", a song by Marillion
 "Ever so blue", a song by Heini Vaikmaa and performed by Rodrigo Fomins
 "Vedenalainen maailma", a song by Laura Sippola
 "Estonia hukk", a lament by Virve Köster
 Lamento, for organ ("Lament over the Estonia Catastrophe") by Erland von Koch

See also
 List of RORO vessel accidents
 List of accidents and disasters by death toll
 List of shipwrecks in 1994

 References 

General

 

 Further reading 
 
 The German 'Group of Experts' (2006). Investigation report on the capsizing on 28 September 1994 in the Baltic Sea of the Ro-Ro Passenger Vessel MV Estonia
 Johnson, Kent L. & Smith, Kenneth M.Jr. (June 2009) "Failure Analysis of the Estonia." Advanced Materials & Processes 167(6): 29–33. 
 The Joint Accident Investigation Commission, CGI reconstruction of the sinking process (4 min video) illustrating the damage to the visor and the ramp.
 Rabe, Jutta (2001), Die Estonia. Tragödie eines Schiffsuntergangs(The Estonia. Tragedy of a ship setting)'', Bielefeld: Delius Klasing, .
 Rabe, Jutta (2004). The Case Estonia – A journalist searching for the truth. Video report about the investigation of the sinking of the Estonia.
 
Langewiesche, William, A Sea Story, The Atlantic Magazine, May 2004.
Limburg, Peter R. (2005), "Deep-Sea Detectives: Maritime Mysteries and Forensic Science". New York: ASJA Press. .
Wilson, Drew (2006), "The Hole: Another look at the sinking of the Estonia Ferry on September 28th 1994". Liskeard: Exposure. .
Ångström, Lars.  Report to the Chancellor of Justice in Sweden, 12 September 2006

 
 Passenger vessel Evacuation descriptions, p29. Det Norske Veritas.
 Safety at Sea Ltd (UK). A collection of scientific papers on the sinking presented in maritime experts' meetings.

External links 
Estonian/Finnish/Swedish Accident Investigation Commission (JAIC) Final Report
The ESTONIA accident 1994 – Swedish Accident Investigation Board
MV Estonia – Accident Investigation Board of Finland
Estoniasamlingen – In Swedish. Governmental resource of material relevant to the catastrophe.
The Mayday call from Estonia (audio) 
Transcript of radio communication
 Estonia Litigation Association – Organization of Relatives and Victims Pressing for Truth through Litigation
Ferry-Site.dk historic images of Viking Sally and Silja Star
 Recording of Jaakko Mäntyjärvi composition: Canticum Calamitatis Maritimae about the disaster
Photos of the memorial for the sunken Estonia at sites-of-memory.de

Sinking
International maritime incidents
Maritime incidents in 1994
Shipwrecks in the Baltic Sea
Maritime incidents in Estonia
Maritime incidents in Finland
September 1994 events in Europe
Sunken cruise ships